Hanna Deinhard (born Johanna Levy; 28 September 1912 − 14 July 1984) was a German-Brazilian-US art historian.

Life 
Born in Osnabrück, Johanna (Hanna) Levy was the second child of Leo and Zilla Levy, her father was a partner in the R. Overmeyer Mechanische Kleider-Wäsche-Fabrik. She attended the "Oberlyzeum für höhere Töchter" in Osnabrück and studied art history, philosophy and German in Munich from 1932. After the seizure of control in 1933, she travelled to Paris on a student trip and, as she was not allowed to continue her studies in Germany because of the discrimination against Jews, then enrolled at the Sorbonne. She had a love affair with the much older cellist Fritz Deinhard, who emigrated with her. Levy was awarded her doctorate in 1936 with the dissertation Heinrich Wölfflin. Sa théorie. Ses prédécesseurs with Charles Lalo and Henri Focillon. In 1937, she gave a lecture on the need for a sociology of art at the 2nd International Congress of Aesthetics and Art Studies in Paris.

Levy emigrated to Brazil in 1937 with her life partner and quickly learned Portuguese. She also brought her parents to Brazil in 1938, who moved to Petrópolis. Levy obtained a teaching position in Rio de Janeiro at the National Institute of Historic and Artistic Heritage to train state officials in general art history, and published articles in the institution's journal. She made her way through other teaching positions, including professor of modern art and art criticism at the Fundação Getulio Vargas in 1946. She published articles on contemporary Brazilian art in Brazilian magazines, daily newspapers and exhibition catalogues. She became friends with the artist Fayga Ostrower.

In January 1948, they moved to the US, where they legalised their relationship. In 1948, Hanna Deinhard received a position as a lecturer at the New School for Social Research in New York. She supplemented her meagre salary by giving tours of New York museums. 
In 1956, they moved to Israel, where she learned Hebrew, gave courses and published. As Fritz Deinhard soon died, she returned to New York to the New School in 1957. From 1961 to 1965, she also taught as an associate professor at Bard College and held teaching positions from 1965 until her retirement in 1978 and from 1973 a professorship at Queens College, City University of New York.

The focus of her teaching was on European art history from the mid-18th to the beginning of the 20th century. Her book "Meaning and Expression. Zur Soziologie der Malerei" (Meaning and Expression: The Sociology of Painting) with two essays on the sociology of art was published in 1967. She participated in debates on contemporary art and gave lectures in Germany, Switzerland and Sweden. After the English translation of "Bedeutung und Ausdruck" appeared in 1970, she was invited to contribute to North American journals and was invited to speak at conferences in the US. In 1978, she moved to Basel and still gave courses there at the Volkshochschule util her death there at the age of 71.

Since 2021, the Art History Department of the University of Basel awards once a year the Hanna Levy-Deinhard Prize for particularly outstanding theses. https://kunstgeschichte.philhist.unibas.ch/de/aktuelles/hanna-levy-deinhard-preis/

Publications 

Hanna Levy
 Henri Wölfflin, Sa théorie. Ses prédécesseurs. Rottweil : M. Rothschild, 1936.
 Sur la nécessité d’une sociologie de l’art. In Actes du Deuxième Congrès International d’Esthétique et de Science de l’Art, Paris 1937, {pp.|342|345}.
 A propósito de três teorias sobre o barroco. In Revista do Serviço do Patrimônio Histórico e Artístico Nacional, N. 5, Rio de Janeiro 1941,  (Numerized; PDF).
 A pintura colonial no Rio de Janeiro. In Revista do Serviço do Patrimônio Histórico e Artístico Nacional, N. 6, Rio de Janeiro 1942,  (Numerized; PDF).
 Modelos Europeus na Pintura Colonial. In Revista do Serviço do Patrimônio Histórico e Artístico Nacional, N. 8, Rio de Janeiro 1944,  (Numerized; PDF).
 Retratos coloniais. In Revista do Serviço do Patrimônio Histórico e Artístico Nacional, N. 9, Rio de Janeiro 1945,  (Numerized; PDF).
Hanna Deinhard
 Bedeutung und Ausdruck. Zur Soziologie der Malerei. Neuwied : Luchterhand 1967.
 Meaning and expression : toward a sociology of art. Boston, Mass. : Beacon Press, 1970 .
 Zur modernen Geschichtsmalerei, in Neue Rundschau 2, 1967, .
 Twentieth-Century Cities and Their Discontents, in The Journal of Aesthetic Education, vol. 8/2, 1974, .
 Reflections on Art History and Sociology of Art, in Art Journal 35/1, 1975, .
 The Work of Art as a Primary Source, in Gerd Wolandt (ed.): Kunst und Kunstforschung. Beiträge zur Ästhetik. Bonn: Bouvier, 1983,  .

References

Further reading 
 Deinhard, Hanna, in Ulrike Wendland: Biographisches Handbuch deutschsprachiger Kunsthistoriker im Exil. Leben und Werk der unter dem Nationalsozialismus verfolgten und vertriebenen Wissenschaftler. Munich : Saur, 1999, 
 Irene Below: „Jene widersinnige Leichtigkeit der Innovation“. Hanna Deinhards Wissenschaftskritik, Kunstsoziologie und Kunstvermittlung. In Ursula Hudson-Wiedenmann, Beate Schmeichel-Falkenberg (ed.): Grenzen Überschreiten. Frauen, Kunst und Exil, Würzburg 2005 , .
 Irene Below, Burcu Dogramaci (ed.): Kunst und Gesellschaft zwischen den Kulturen: Die Kunsthistorikerin Hanna Levy-Deinhard im Exil und ihre Aktualität heute. Munich: edition text + kritik, 2016, dort unter anderem eine Kurzvita und ein Schriftenverzeichnis auf S. 321 bis S. 342.
 Adriana Sanajotti Nakamuta (ed.): Hanna Levy no SPHAN. História da arte e patrimônio. IPHAN, Rio de Janeiro 2010, .
 Norbert Schneider: Zu Hanna Deinhards Konzept einer „allgemeinen Soziologie“ der Kunst. InKunst und Politik, vol. 16, 2014, .

External links 
  
 Daniela Pinheiro Machado Kern: Hanna Levy e a história da arte brasileira como problema, in EHA - Encontro de História da Arte, 2014, PDF

German art historians
American art historians
Women art historians
Bard College faculty
Queens College, City University of New York faculty
Emigrants from Nazi Germany to the United States
1912 births
1984 deaths
Writers from Osnabrück